The Temasek class a class of container ships consisting of 10 ships in total. The ships were built for APL by Hyundai Samho Heavy Industries.

History 
The ships were originally ordered in 2011 by Neptune Orient Lines (NOL). They were to be delivered in 2013 and 2014. Five of the ships were chartered to Mitsui O.S.K. Lines (MOL). Construction started in 2012 and the first ship was delivered on 13 March 2013. 

In 2017, around the same time as the first new Triumph-class container ship went into service the charter ended. The ships were renamed and became part of the APL fleet. 

In 2018 and 2019 eight of the ships were modified at the Cosco Zhoushan Shipyard and CSIC Qingdao Beihai Shipyard in China. The ships were made longer by adding two extra container bays and the wheelhouse was raised so that the containers can be stacked higher on deck.

List of ships

References 

Container ship classes
Ships built by Hyundai Heavy Industries Group